Unjha is a town and a municipality in the Mehsana district of the Indian state of Gujarat. Unjha is 26 km north of Mehsana and 102 km north of Ahmedabad.

Geography
It has an average elevation of 111 metres (364 feet).

Demographics

The 2001 Indian census shows that Unjha had a population of 53,868.

Religion Wise Populations

Places

Temples
There is a temple in Unjha dedicated to the Hindu Goddess Umiya. Umiya is considered a clan deity of the Kadva Patidar community. This temple is located in the center of the town and is a place of pilgrimage. Other major temples include the Baloj Mata temple near the bus station. There is also a Dwarkadhishji Temple of the Pushtimarg Vaishnava sect located in Nava Mahad, near Brahman Chora, and a Kabir Ashram for the followers of Kabir.

There is a centuries-old Kunthunath Jain temple in the town. There are also 2 other main Jain temples. One of them is located in the heart of the city and is called the Adinath Jain temple. The third temple contains an ancient idol of the lord Mahavira.

Education
Currently, Unjha has several schools for science, commerce and the arts, including:

 Unjha Public School
 Shihi Std 9 to 12 Science ( Science Non-Government)
 Sheth Shree G. V. Patel Charitable Trust Sarvajanik Vidhyalay Shahi

There are several institutions of higher learning in Unjha, including a B.B.A. College, a Law College, a Teacher Training College, a Women's Residential College and a Commerce and Arts College.

Recreation
There is a recreational pond near the center of town. Other popular recreation areas include various wadis and places where marriages and other occasions are held. The town has many wadis and each particular sub-caste of Patel has a particular wadi dedicated to it. Examples include Rangpur Samaaj wadi, Raman wadi, Unava Desh ni Wadi, Bhraman ni wadi, Omiya dash ni wadi, Zanskar Bharti wadi, and Achleshawar Ni Wadi.

Economy
Unjha is known as the biggest spice and cumin seed market in Asia and one of the biggest regulated markets in India.

In the financial year 2012–13, the value of trade passing through Unjha totalled US $353 million. Major importers of Unjhan products include countries such as US, Germany, Central America, New Zealand, Portugal, and Poland.

The nearest seaport is Mundra Port. The proximity to a port gives an advantage to Unjhan spice exporters by enabling them to export quality spices at competitive rates.

There are many direct manufacturer exporters of Indian spices and oilseeds located in Unjha.

Agricultural produce market committee 
The Agricultural produce market committee in Unjha features farmers and traders from states like Rajasthan, Gujarat, and Saurashtra who come to trade and sell spices and oilseeds like cumin, fennel, fenugreek, dill, ajwain, mustard, sesame, coriander, etc. Aside from Rajasthan, Unjha is the only place that can grow cumin, fennel, and Isabgol (psyllium) seeds in the region. There are nearly 800 businesses that produce these spices. The agricultural produce market committee was established by Shri Mohanbhai Haribhai Patel in 1954.

Notable people
 Musician and sarod player Vasant Rai is from Unjha. There is a music school named after him in the city. Shri Mohanbhai Haribhai Patel who established the agricultural produce market committee, Arts, Commerce, and Law colleges, Eye Hospital and Unjha Cottage Hospital.

See also
Unava
Tundav
Maktupur

References

Cities and towns in Mehsana district